The Best of Hootie & the Blowfish (1993 thru 2003) is a compilation album by the rock band Hootie & the Blowfish, released in 2004.

Track listing
"Hold My Hand" – 4:15
"Only Wanna Be with You" – 3:46
"Time" – 4:53
"Let Her Cry" – 5:08
"Not Even the Trees" – 4:37
"Old Man & Me (When I Get to Heaven)" – 4:27
"Hey, Hey, What Can I Do" – 3:52
"Tucker's Town" – 3:45
"I Go Blind" – 3:14
"Sad Caper" – 2:49
"Be the One" – 3:25
"Use Me" – 5:01
"I Will Wait" – 4:15
"Innocence" – 3:24
"Space" – 2:15
"Only Lonely" – 4:38
"Goodbye Girl" (Originally recorded by David Gates) – 3:15

References

2004 greatest hits albums
Albums produced by Don Gehman
Albums produced by Don Was
Hootie & the Blowfish albums
Atlantic Records compilation albums
Rhino Records compilation albums